The 2020–21 Lebanese Women's Football League was the 14th edition of the Lebanese Women's Football League since it was formed in 2008.

It began on 23 May 2021, and 11 teams are participating, divided into a group of five and a group of six. Safa won their first title, after beating ÓBerytus 6–1 in the final matchday of the season.

League table

Group A

Group B

Final six

Top goalscorers

References

External links
 RSSSF.com

Lebanese Women's Football League seasons
W1
Lebanese Women's Football League